The East of England Women's County Championship is a domestic women's one-day cricket competition in England. The tournament began in 2020, with the aim of providing longer-format cricket in the East of England region after reforms to the structure of domestic women's cricket in England. The tournament currently sees seven teams competing in a 45-over competition.

History
The East of England Women's County Championship was originally conceived in 2020 as a 50-over competition to provide longer-format cricket in the region after the abolition of the Women's County Championship. However, the COVID-19 pandemic delayed the start of the season and caused that year's national Women's Twenty20 Cup to be cancelled, resulting in a decision to play a 45-over competition (to allow extra time for sanitisation breaks) as well as a separate Twenty20 competition.

Buckinghamshire, Hertfordshire, Huntingdonshire and Norfolk competed in 2020. The 45-over tournament was won by Hertfordshire and the Twenty20 tournament was won by Buckinghamshire.

The 2021 edition was competed as a 45-over tournament, with Cambridgeshire and Lincolnshire joining to make it a six-team event. Each team played the other teams once in a round robin format, starting on 2 May, with the team with the most points being crowned champions. Buckinghamshire won the tournament, winning four of their five matches to finish top of the league with 73 points, with Hertfordshire second with 70 points.

Ahead of the 2022 season, it was announced that Leicestershire, Northamptonshire and Suffolk would be joining the competition, whilst Buckinghamshire and Cambridgeshire would be withdrawing, bringing the number of teams competing to seven. Suffolk won the competition, winning five of their six matches.

Teams

Current teams

Former teams

Results

References

Women's cricket competitions in England
English domestic cricket competitions
Cricket in Buckinghamshire
Cricket in Cambridgeshire
Cricket in Hertfordshire
Cricket in Huntingdonshire
Cricket in Leicestershire
Cricket in Lincolnshire
Cricket in Norfolk
Cricket in Northamptonshire
Cricket in Suffolk
2020 establishments in England